Caesars were a Swedish indie rock band from Stockholm, formed in 1995. In their native country, the band was originally known as Caesars Palace, a name which was changed to avoid conflicting with the name of the Las Vegas hotel. In the rest of Scandinavia they are known as Twelve Caesars.

Career
Outside of Sweden, the band are best known for the song "Jerk It Out", which was originally featured in the snowboarding video Afterbang in 2002, as well as the Electronic Arts video games SSX 3 and FIFA Football 2004, and on the PlayStation 2 game LMA Manager 2005. The song also appeared in the Wii games Just Dance and Dance Dance Revolution SuperNova, and in the Wii version of Samba de Amigo as downloadable content. It has also been the backdrop of television advertisements for brands such as iPod (2005) and Renault (2009). The song is featured on the band's 39 Minutes of Bliss (In an Otherwise Meaningless World), Paper Tigers, and Love for the Streets albums. The song is featured in episode 2 of Super Pumped.

Their song "We Got to Leave" is the theme song for the television series Confessions of a Matchmaker. The song also appears in films such as John Tucker Must Die and The Benchwarmers.

The album Strawberry Weed was released in Scandinavia on 5 March 2008. The 24-track long double album was produced by Ebbot Lundberg from Soundtrack of Our Lives. A significant difference from previous albums was that guitarist Joakim Åhlund and drummer Nino Keller shared vocal duty with César Vidal.

In an interview on Sveriges Radio P3 on February 13, 2012, Joakim Åhlund said that the band is on hiatus until further notice.

In December 2017, Caesars played a surprise reunion gig in Stockholm, their first since 2009. In 2018, the band performed in Stockholm's Popaganda Festival. The band played several shows in Sweden through 2019 before entering a second hiatus.
 
Band member Joakim Åhlund is also a founding member of the Teddybears.

Band members
Final lineup
César Vidal – lead vocals, guitar (1995–2012, 2017–2019)
Joakim Åhlund – guitars, backing and occasional lead vocals (1995–2012, 2017–2019)
David Lindqvist – bass (1996–2012, 2017–2019)
Nino Keller – drums, backing and occasional lead vocals (2000–2012, 2017–2019)

Former members
Jens Örjenheim – drums (1998–2000)
Klas Åhlund – keyboards, various instruments, production (1998–2002; session/touring musician)

Discography

Albums
Youth Is Wasted on the Young (as "Twelve Caesars"), released 8 December 1998
Cherry Kicks (as "Caesars Palace"), released 2000 (Gold in Sweden)
Love for the Streets (as "Caesars Palace"), released 2002 (Gold in Sweden)
Paper Tigers, released 26 April 2005 (#13 SWE) (#40 UK)
Strawberry Weed, released 5 March 2008 (#16 SWE)

Singles
1995 – Shake It 3-track EP: "Shake It" / "Odd Job" / "Born Cool  [7-inch Dolores]
1996 – Rock De Puta Mierda 7-track EP: "Phenobarbital" / "3D-TV" / "Automatic" / "Crap-thinker" / "This Man, This Monster" / "Pupo Diavolo" / "You're My Favorurite"
1998 – "Kick You Out"
1998 – "Sort It Out"
2000 – "From the Bughouse" / "Punkrocker" (Original version) / "Love Bubble"
2000 – "Crackin' Up"
2000 – "Fun 'n' Games"
2000 – "Only You" [Promo]
2002 – "Jerk It Out" / "Out of My Hands" / "She's a Planet"
2002 – "Over 'fore It Started" / "Sparky"
2002 – "Candy Kane" / "Artificial Gravity"
2002 – "Get Off My Cloud" (Rolling stones cover)/ "Bound and Dominated" LP-single from Dolores singelklubb 300EX''
2003 – "Jerk It Out", released 7 April 2003; re-released 18 April 2005
2005 – "We Got to Leave" / "Longer We Stay Together"
2005 – "Paper Tigers" / "Up All Night"
2005 – "It's Not the Fall That Hurts"
2007 – "No Tomorrow" / "Every Road Leads to Home"
2008 – "Boo Boo Goo Goo"

References

External links

 Caesars American Label website
 [ AMG Overview]
 

Video game musicians
Swedish indie rock groups
Swedish garage rock groups
English-language singers from Sweden
Virgin Records artists
Dolores Recordings artists
Minty Fresh artists